Sharps Shooting Stars FC are a football club from Gaborone, Botswana, currently playing in the Botswana Premier League. Their club colour is gold.

History
The club were formed in 1984.

Led by Keitsumetse Pio Paul, Sharps won the 2016-17 First Division South, and gained promotion to the Botswana Premier League for the first time. They finished mid-table in their first season in the league.

Sharps exceeded expectations at the start of the 2018-19 campaign, winning their first three matches and sitting third on the ladder after the first 11 games.

References

Football clubs in Botswana